Turbonilla funiculata is a species of sea snail, a marine gastropod mollusk in the family Pyramidellidae, the pyrams and their allies.

Distribution
This marine species occurs off Vietnam; off Israel (non-indigenous)

References

 Thiele, J. (1925). Gastropoden der Deutschen Tiefsee-Expedition. II Teil. Wissenschaftliche Ergebnisse der Deutschen Tiefsee-Expedition auf dem Dampfer "Valdivia" 1898-1899. 17(2): 35-382, pls 13-46

External links
 Folin L. de & Périer L. (1867-1887). Les fonds de la mer. Paris: Savy. 4 volumes. Dates after Rehder (1946), Proceedings of the Malacological Society of London, 27: 74-75. Vol. 1: 1-48 (1867), 49-112 (1868), 113-176 (1869), 177-256 (1870), 257-272 (1872), pls 1-32; Vol. 2: 1-64 (1872), 65-112 (1873), 113-124 (1874), 125-160 (1875), 161-208 (1873), 209-304 (1874), 305-360 (1875), 361-365 (1876), pls 1-11; Vol. 3: 1-96 (1876), 97-208 (1877), 209-304 (1879), 305-337 (1880), pls 1-9; Vol. 4: 1-32 (1881), 33-148 (1881-1884), 149-192 (1884-1887), 192-240 (1887), pls 1-15. Dates for plates not exactly known
 Saurin, E. 1959. Pyramidellidae de Nhatrang (Vietnam). Annales de la Faculté des Sciences (Saigon) 1959: 223-283, pls. 1-9.
 To Encyclopedia of Life
 To World Register of Marine Species

funiculata
Gastropods described in 1868